Griqualand East Commando was a light infantry regiment of the South African Army. It formed part of the South African Army Infantry Formation as well as the South African Territorial Reserve.

History

Origins

Rifle Association
Griqualand East Commando can trace its origin to a Defence Rifle Association formed by a Captain Woods of the Cape Mounted Rifles around 1884. Its primary aim was for the farming community to be able to defend themselves against hostile tribes that stole their cattle.

Operations

With the UDF
By 1948, the Griqualand East Rifle Association was formed to manage local area defence. In 1953, Mount Currie Rifle Association in Kokstad amalgamated with the Grqiualand East Rifle Association which saw the formation of the Commando in Kokstad.

With the SADF
By 1984 however the commando moved to Cedarville as a disused school had become available for accommodation.

Area of responsibility
Griqualand East Commando was responsible for the magisterial district of Mount Currie.

Higher headquarters
The commando was under the command of Natal Command from 1930 to 1950 but then placed under Eastern Province Command, this situation reverted again in 1960 due to the establishment of the Transkei.

Freedom of entry
The Freedom of the town of Kokstad was granted to the commando in 1993.

With the SANDF

Disbandment
This unit, along with all other Commando units was disbanded after a decision by South African President Thabo Mbeki to disband all Commando Units. The Commando system was phased out between 2003 and 2008 "because of the role it played in the apartheid era", according to the Minister of Safety and Security Charles Nqakula.

Unit Insignia

Leadership 

 Cmdt A.L.A. Maartins 1952-1972
 Cmdt J.H. Venter 1973-1977
 Cmdt S.A. Ponder 1977-1981
 Lt Col D.W. Schoeman 1982-

References

See also 
 South African Commando System

Infantry regiments of South Africa
South African Commando Units